Oleg Dmitriyevich Davydov (born 25 May 1940) is a Russian economist who formerly served in the Russian government of Prime Minister Viktor Chernomyrdin as the minister and Deputy Chairman of Government responsible for foreign economic relations. In this position he led negotiations for Russia's first bid to join the World Trade Organization.

Career in government
After being appointed Deputy Prime Minister for foreign trade in the fall of 1993, he began to liberalize Russia's export regulations in order to appeal to Western economic partners. This was also part of an effort to eventually join the World Trade Organization. The first meeting with WTO officials took place in July 1995, with Davydov leading the Russian delegation, but the process to enter was postponed after the 1998 Russian financial crisis.

Davydov paid a visit to Tehran and praised increased Russian–Iranian cooperation in 1995. In Europe he negotiated to reschedule Russia's debt payments to some six hundred banks. In September of that year, at an economic forum in Beijing, Davydov stated that Russia's strategic goal is to increase cooperation with Asia-Pacific countries. In March 1996 he identified China as the country's main strategic partner in the region. Davydov stated: "Moscow's turn to the Asian Pacific region is dictated by its firm conviction that the center of global trade in the 21st century will move to this region, which already accounts for 40 percent of global turnover." Later, in December of the same year, he traveled to Singapore and met with then-Brigadier General Lee Hsien Loong, future Prime Minister of Singapore.

In 1997 Davydov also referred to India as an important strategic partner for Russia, stating that the country did not allow Ukraine a license to export parts of T-80 and other tanks, as the Russian government did not want Ukraine to sell it to India's traditional adversary Pakistan.

Other work
In 2000, he worked with Valery Oreshkin to publish a book titled Liberalization of Russian Foreign Trade: Problems and Prospects.

Sources

References

Books
 
 

1940 births
20th-century Russian politicians
Deputy heads of government of the Russian Federation
Government ministers of Russia
Living people
Recipients of the Order "For Merit to the Fatherland", 3rd class
Russian diplomats
Economists from Moscow